Selwyn Sese Ala (August 14, 1986 – November 9, 2015) was a ni-Vanuatu footballer who played as a defender. He died aged 29 on November 9, 2015; the cause of death was suicide.

References 

1986 births

2015 suicides
Vanuatuan footballers
Vanuatu international footballers
Association football defenders
Spirit 08 F.C. players
2012 OFC Nations Cup players
Deaths in Vanuatu